Astley was a railway station on the Liverpool and Manchester Railway on Chat Moss to the south of Astley village in what was then the county of Lancashire, England.

History

Opened in the 1840s by the Liverpool and Manchester Railway, the station became part of the Grand Junction Railway on 8 August 1845. The GJR merged to form the London and North Western Railway on 16 July 1846. The LNWR became part of the London Midland and Scottish Railway during the grouping of 1923. The station then passed to the London Midland Region of British Railways on nationalisation in 1948 and was closed by the British Railways Board on 7 May 1956. It was subsequently demolished.

The site today

Trains on the now electrified, more northerly of the two Liverpool to Manchester Lines still pass through the station site. The buildings have been demolished and a signal box built since the station's closure occupies part of the site. An electrical switching site is being constructed in the vicinity as part of the Manchester - Liverpool (via Earlestown) section of the NW electrification schemes. The level crossing is locked and unlocked by the signaller, but is operated manually by road users.

References

Notes

Bibliography

Further reading

External links
 The station on a 1948 OS Map via npe maps
 The station on an 1849 OS map via National Library of Scotland
 The line and mileages via railwaycodes

Disused railway stations in the Metropolitan Borough of Wigan
Former London and North Western Railway stations
Railway stations in Great Britain opened in 1844
Railway stations in Great Britain closed in 1956
1844 establishments in England
1956 disestablishments in England